Elkhart Downtown Commercial Historic District is a national historic district located at Elkhart, Elkhart County, Indiana. The district encompasses 59 contributing buildings in the central business district of Elkhart.  It was developed between about 1868 and 1930, and includes notable examples of Italianate, Queen Anne, and Classical Revival style architecture.  Located in the district are the separately listed Green Block, Lerner Theatre, and Young Women's Christian Association.  Other notable buildings include the Cornish Block (c. 1875), Franklin Street Station (1895), Menges Building (1908), former Post Office (1905), Midwest Museum of Modern Art (1922), Elkhart Water Company, Masonic Temple, Rowe Block (1900), and Dreves Building (c. 1915).

It was added to the National Register of Historic Places in 1997.

References

External links

Historic districts on the National Register of Historic Places in Indiana
Italianate architecture in Indiana
Queen Anne architecture in Indiana
Neoclassical architecture in Indiana
Buildings and structures in Elkhart, Indiana
Historic districts in Elkhart County, Indiana
National Register of Historic Places in Elkhart County, Indiana
1868 establishments in Indiana